The Tree of the Year competition is held in the United Kingdom in autumn each year by the Woodland Trust, a nationwide conservation charity. Nominated trees are shortlisted by a panel of experts, before going to public votes to select a tree of the year for each of the four constituent countries of the United Kingdom. The panel then selects one of these to become Britain's tree of the year and be nominated for the following year's European Tree of the Year. The competition has been run each year since 2014.

History 
The European Tree of the Year competition has been running since 2011 and selects a tree from participating countries (now 13 in number) by public vote. It was inspired by an earlier Czech national contest. Most countries hold a national poll to select their entrant for each year. Nominations are made in the year preceding the award. The United Kingdom did not enter the competition until 2013 when Niel Gow's Oak and the Oak at the Gate of the Dead were nominated for Scotland and Wales respectively for entry into the 2014 award. These trees finished seventh and ninth out of the 10 entries for that year. 

The following year, the Woodland Trust took responsibility for nominating British entries into the competition. It instigated national competitions in England, Wales and Scotland. The winners of this competition were entered into the European Tree of the Year awards for 2015. 

In 2015, the British awards were widened to include Northern Ireland. The Woodland Trust altered the format in 2016, introducing an additional round of voting to name a single tree of the year for the whole country. All four national winners were still entered into the European competition. As of 2017, only the overall British winner is entered into the European Tree of the Year awards.

Format
The four national competitions are run in September and October and ranking is determined by public vote on the Woodland Trust's website. Nominations can be made by any individual or organisation by early August and a shortlist is compiled by a panel of independent experts to put forward to the public vote. Each national winner receives a £1,000 grant from the People's Postcode Lottery to be used for any purpose in relation to the tree – this could range from a survey or health check, remedial works, plaques and signs or a celebratory event. A selection of the shortlisted trees also receive grants of £500. Following the public vote, one of the four trees is selected by a panel of experts to become Britain's Tree of the Year and be nominated as the entry into the European awards, voting for which runs through January and February of the following year. In 2018 the Woodland Trust switched format, such that the overall British winner was decided by a public vote co-ordinated with the BBC's The One Show.  

In 2019 the competition reverted to a panel of judges to select the overall British entrant, though the title "Britain's Tree of the Year" was not used. Individual national trees of the year were not chosen in 2021, with a public vote selecting the winner from a shortlist of ten from across Britain. Individual winners were again not chosen in 2022, with Britain's Tree of the Year being selected by judges from a shortlist of twelve from across all four countries.

Results

Britain's Tree of the Year 
2016 Brimmon Oak
2017 Gilwell Oak
2018 Nellie's Tree
2019 Allerton Oak
2020 Survivor Tree
2021 Kippford Leaning Tree
2022 Waverley Abbey Yew

England's Tree of the Year
2014 Major Oak
2015 Cubbington Pear Tree
2016 Sycamore Gap Tree
2017 Gilwell Oak
2018 Nellie's Tree
2019 Allerton Oak
2020 Happy Man Tree

Scotland's Tree of the Year
2013 Niel Gow's Oak
2014 Lady's Tree
2015 The Suffragette Oak
2016 Ding Dong tree
2017 Big Tree, Kirkwall
2018 Netty's Tree
2019 Last Ent of Affric
2020 Survivor Tree

Wales' Tree of the Year
2013 Oak at the Gate of the Dead
2014 Lonely Tree
2015 Llanarthne Oak
2016 Brimmon Oak
2017 Hollow Tree, Neath Port Talbot
2018 Pwllpriddog Oak
2019 Old Sweet Chestnut, Pontypool Park
2020 Chapter House Tree

Northern Ireland's Tree of the Year
2015 Woodvale Park Peace Tree
2016 Holm Oak, Kilbroney Park, Rostrevor ("Old Homer")
2017 Erskine House Tree
2018 Multi-stemmed Giant Sequoia, Castlewellan
2019 Invisible Tree
2020 - competition not run, Woodland Trust team in this region instead celebrated the 20th anniversary of their Woods on Your Doorstep scheme.

See also
 List of individual trees

Notes

References 

Competitions in the United Kingdom
Trees of the United Kingdom